Kirtsik (Kaitag: Гъирцӏиччи) is a rural locality (a selo) and the administrative centre of Kirtsiksky Selsoviet, Kaytagsky District, Republic of Dagestan, Russia. The population was 96 as of 2010.

Geography 
Kirtsik is located 26 km south of Madzhalis (the district's administrative centre) by road. Varsit and Shuragat are the nearest rural localities.

Nationalities 
Dargins live there.

References 

Rural localities in Kaytagsky District